Seven Shades of Heartbreak is the debut extended play by English musician, Mimi Webb. The EP was released on 22 October 2021 through Epic Records.

Background
The EP includes the singles "Good Without", "Dumb Love", "24/5", along with the promotional single "Halfway". It debuted at number nine on the UK Albums Chart and spent 4 weeks on the chart. It also charted in Ireland, Norway and Switzerland.

Track listing

Charts

Certifications

Release history

References

2021 debut EPs
Albums produced by TMS (production team)
Epic Records EPs
Mimi Webb albums